The Peerless was a 3/4ths sized version of the White Sewing Machine Company's vibrating shuttle-based sewing machine named the White Sewing Machine.  It was developed at the end of the 19th century as a portable version of what was a very heavy machine.

References

Sewing machines